First Lady of Slovakia or Gentleman of Slovakia (Prvá Dáma in Slovak) is the title attributed to the wife or husband of the president of Slovakia.  The country's current first gentleman is Juraj Rizman, partner of President Zuzana Čaputová, who had held the position since June 15, 2019.

The position should not be confused with the husband or wife of the prime minister of Slovakia.

History
Emília Kováčová, the country's inaugural first lady from 1993 to 1998, created the official protocols and symbols for the new office of the first lady.

First ladies and gentlemen of Slovakia

References

Slovakia
Slovak women in politics

sk:Prvá dáma Slovenskej republiky